The 2001 Thalgo Australian Women's Hardcourts doubles was a tennis competition within the 2001 Thalgo Australian Women's Hardcourts, a tennis tournament played on outdoor hard courts at the Hope Island Resort Tennis Centre in Hope Island, Queensland in Australia and was part of Tier III of the 2001 WTA Tour. The tournament ran from 31 December 2000 through 6 January 2001.

Julie Halard-Decugis and Anna Kournikova were the defending champions but did not compete that year.

Giulia Casoni and Janette Husárová won in the final 7–6(11–9), 7–5 against Katie Schlukebir and Meghann Shaughnessy.

Seeds
Champion seeds are indicated in bold text while text in italics indicates the round in which those seeds were eliminated.

 Cătălina Cristea /  Irina Selyutina (quarterfinals)
 Åsa Carlsson /  Silvia Farina Elia (quarterfinals)
 Katie Schlukebir /  Meghann Shaughnessy (final)
 Patty Schnyder /  Magüi Serna (semifinals)

Draw

Qualifying

Seeds
  Trudi Musgrave /  Bryanne Stewart (second round)
  Janet Lee /  Wynne Prakusya (final round)

Qualifiers
  Elena Bovina /  Lina Krasnoroutskaya

Draw
 ''NB: The first two rounds used the pro set format.

References
 2001 Thalgo Australian Women's Hardcourts Doubles Draw

2001 Thalgo Australian Women's Hardcourts
2001 WTA Tour